The Kompol Jazz is a Polish ultralight trike, designed and produced by Kompol of Świercze, Pułtusk County. The aircraft is supplied as a complete ready-to-fly-aircraft.

Design and development
It features a cable-braced hang glider-style high-wing, weight-shift controls, a two-seats-in-tandem open cockpit with a cockpit fairing, tricycle landing gear with wheel pants and a single engine in pusher configuration.

The aircraft is made from bolted-together aluminum tubing, with its double surface wing covered in Dacron sailcloth. Its  span wing is supported by a single tube-type kingpost and uses an "A" frame weight-shift control bar. The standard supplied powerplant is a twin cylinder, liquid-cooled, two-stroke, dual-ignition  Rotax 582 engine.

A number of different wings can be fitted to the basic carriage, including the Kompol Stratus 15 and the higher aspect ratio and smaller area Stratus 13. Other manufacturer's wings can also be used.

Operational history
The Jazz has been widely used in competition flying and has won many microlight events.

Specifications (Jazz 2000 with Stratus 15)

References

External links

2000s Polish sport aircraft
2000s Polish ultralight aircraft
Single-engined pusher aircraft
Ultralight trikes